Notoacmea is a southern genus of true limpets, marine gastropod molluscs in the subfamily Lottiinae of the family Lottiidae, the true limpets.

Species 
According to the World Register of Marine Species (WoRMS), the following species with accepted names are species within the genus Notoacmaea:
 Notoacmea alta Oliver, 1926
 Notoacmea badia (Oliver, 1926)
 Notoacmea biradiata (Reeve, 1855)
 Notoacmea cellanoides Oliver, 1926
 † Notoacmea chattonensis Laws, 1932 
 Notoacmea conoidea (Quoy & Gaimard, 1834)
 Notoacmea corrodenda (May, 1920)
 Notoacmea daedala (Suter, 1907)
 Notoacmea elongata (Quoy & Gaimard, 1834)
 Notoacmea flammea (Quoy & Gaimard, 1834)
 Notoacmea mayi (May, 1923)
 † Notoacmea nukumaruensis W. R. B. Oliver, 1926 
 † Notoacmea otahuhuensis Laws, 1950 
 Notoacmea parviconoidea (Suter, 1907)
 Notoacmea petterdi (Tenison-Woods, 1876)
 Notoacmea pileopsis (Quoy & Gaimard, 1834) - black edged limpet
 Notoacmea potae Nakano, Marshall, Kennedy & Spencer, 2009
 Notoacmea rapida Nakano, Marshall, Kennedy & Spencer, 2009
 Notoacmea scapha (Suter, 1907)
 Notoacmea scopulina Oliver, 1926
 Notoacmea sturnus (Hombron & Jacquinot, 1841)
 Notoacmea subantarctica Oliver, 1926
 Notoacmea subtilis (Suter, 1907) 
 Notoacmea turbatrix Nakano, Marshall, Kennedy & Spencer, 2009

The following list comes from Powell  New Zealand Mollusca:
 Notoacmea insessa - seaweed limpet: synonym of Discurria insessa (Hinds, 1842)
 Notoacmea paleacea - surfgrass limpet
 Notoacmea persona - mask limpet: synonym of Lottia persona  (J. Rathke, 1833)

Species brought into synonymy
 Notoacmea concinna (Lischke, 1870): synonym of Nipponacmea concinna (Lischke, 1870)
 Notoacmea corrosa W. R. B. Oliver, 1926: synonym of Notoacmea alta W. R. B. Oliver, 1926 (junior synonym)
 Notoacmea daedala Oliver, 1926: synonym of Notoacmea elongata (Quoy & Gaimard, 1834)
 Notoacmea daedala Iredale, 1915: synonym of Notoacmea daedala (Suter, 1907)
 Notoacmea depicta (Hinds, 1842): synonym of Tectura depicta (Hinds, 1842)
 Notoacmea elongata Ponder & Creese, 1980: synonym of Notoacmea daedala (Suter, 1907)
 Notoacmea explorata Dell, 1953: synonym of Maoricrater explorata (Dell, 1953)
 Notoacmea fascicularis (Menke, 1851): synonym of Lottia fascicularis (Menke, 1851)
 Notoacmea fenestrata (Reeve, 1855): synonym of Lottia fenestrata (Reeve, 1855)
 Notoacmea filosa (Carpenter, 1865): synonym of Lottia filosa (Carpenter, 1865)
 Notoacmea fuscoviridis Teramachi, 1949: synonym of Nipponacmea fuscoviridis (Teramachi, 1949) (original combination)
 Notoacmea granulosa Macpherson, 1955: synonym of Notoacmea flammea (Quoy & Gaimard, 1834) (junior synonym)
 Notoacmea helmsi Iredale, 1915: synonym of Notoacmea elongata (Quoy & Gaimard, 1834)
 Notoacmea inconspicua (Gray in Dieffenbach, 1843): synonym of Radiacmea inconspicua (Gray in Dieffenbach, 1843)
 Notoacmea insessa (Hinds, 1842): synonym of Discurria insessa (Hinds, 1842)
 Notoacmea mixta (Reeve, 1855): synonym of Patelloida flammea Quoy & Gaimard, 1834: synonym of Notoacmea flammea (Quoy & Gaimard, 1834)
 Notoacmea nigrans Kira, 1961: synonym of Nipponacmea nigrans (Kira, 1961) (original combination)
 Notoacmea pumila Lindberg & McLean, 1981: synonym of Tectura pumila (Lindberg & McLean, 1981)
 Notoacmea radula Kira, 1961: synonym of Nipponacmea radula (Kira, 1961) (original combination)
 Notoacmea rothi Lindberg & McLean, 1981: synonym of Lottia rothi (Lindberg & McLean, 1981)
 Notoacmea schrenckii (Lischke, 1868): synonym of Nipponacmea schrenckii (Lischke, 1868)
 Notoacmea scutum (Rathke, 1833): synonym of Lottia scutum (Rathke, 1833)
 Notoacmea septiformis Quoy & Gaimard, 1834: synonym of Lottia septiformis (Quoy & Gaimard, 1834) (original combination)
 Notoacmea suteri Iredale, 1915: synonym of Asteracmea suteri (Iredale, 1915)
 Notoacmea teramachii Kira, 1961: synonym of Nipponacmea teramachii (Kira, 1961) (original combination)
 Notoacmea testudinalis (O. F. Müller, 1776): synonym of Testudinalia testudinalis (O. F. Müller, 1776)
 Notoacmea ubiquita Lindberg & McLean, 1981: synonym of Tectura ubiquita (Lindberg & McLean, 1981)
 Notoacmea virescens Oliver, 1926: synonym of Notoacmea elongata (Quoy & Gaimard, 1834)

References

 Oliver, W. R. B. (1926). Australasian Patelloididae. Transactions of the New Zealand Institute 56: 547-582.
 Nakano T., Marshall B.A., Kennedy M., Spencer H.G. (2009). The phylogeny and taxonomy of New Zealand Notoacmea and Patelloida species (Mollusca: Patellogastropoda: Lottiidae) inferred from DNA sequences. Molluscan Research 29: 33-59.
 Ponder, W. F.; Creese, R. G. (1980). A revision of the Australian species of Notoacmea, Collisella and Patelloida (Mollusca: Gastropoda: Acmaeidae). Journal of the Malacological Society of Australia. 4(4): 167-208.

External links
 Iredale T. (1915). A commentary on Suter's Manual of the New Zealand Mollusca. Transactions and Proceedings of the New Zealand Institute. 47: 417-497.

Lottiidae
Gastropods of New Zealand